The Ausable River, also known as AuSable River and originally written as "Au Sable", runs in the U.S. state of New York, from the Adirondack Mountains and past the village of Lake Placid and Au Sable Forks to empty into Lake Champlain (at ). It has an East and West branch that join at Au Sable Forks.  The river forms a partial boundary between Clinton County and Essex County.  The Ausable River is known for its gorge, Ausable Chasm, located a few miles east of Keeseville.

It was originally named "Au Sable" (French for "sandy") by Samuel de Champlain when he first explored the region in 1609 because of its extensive sandy delta.

West Branch Ausable River

At high water-levels, the upper end provides demanding white-water paddling opportunities. Further along, it runs through High Falls Gorge at the Wilmington Notch, a gorge formed by a fault zone, with  cliffs on one side and  cliffs on the other.

East Branch Ausable River
The East Branch arises from Upper and Lower Ausable lakes in the Ausable Valley, which forms the south side of the Great Range.  The first  are especially scenic, and can be viewed from trails on either side maintained by the Adirondack Trail Improvement Society.  The river is then met by the Cascade Brook which flows from the Cascade Lakes, beneath Cascade Mountain, on its way to Au Sable Forks.

See also
List of rivers in New York

References

Adirondacks
Rivers of New York (state)
Rivers of Essex County, New York
Rivers of Clinton County, New York
Tributaries of Lake Champlain